BPM "Dance Unlimited" II (stylized as BPM "DANCE∞" II) is the third remix album by J-pop duo Two-Mix, released by WEA Japan on November 21, 2001. It features remixes of eight of the duo's hit singles. The album includes a bonus CD-ROM containing three music videos.

The album peaked at No. 85 on Oricon's weekly albums chart.

Track listing

Charts

References

External links 
 
 
 

2001 remix albums
Two-Mix albums
Japanese-language compilation albums
Warner Music Japan compilation albums